The Tempest (Stormen), Op. 109, is incidental music to Shakespeare's The Tempest, by Jean Sibelius. He composed it in 1925–26, at about the same time as he wrote his tone poem Tapiola. Sibelius derived two suites from the score.

The music is said to display an astounding richness of imagination and inventive capacity, and is considered by some as one of Sibelius's greatest achievements.  He represented individual characters through instrumentation choices: particularly admired was his use of harps and percussion to represent Prospero, said to capture the "resonant ambiguity of the character".

History 
Sibelius had completed his 7th Symphony, which was to be his last, in 1924.  The Tempest and Tapiola were to be his last great works, and he wrote little else for the remaining 32 years of his life, which came to be known as "The Silence of Järvenpää".

The idea for music for The Tempest was first suggested to Sibelius in 1901, by his friend Axel Carpelan.  In 1925, his Danish publisher Wilhelm Hansen again raised the idea, as the Royal Theatre in Copenhagen was going to stage the work the following year, directed by Adam Poulsen.  Sibelius wrote it from the autumn of 1925 through to the early part of 1926, during which time he turned 60. (Although according to Sibelius's journal, he was working on the music in May 1927.)

The complete music lasts for over an hour.  It originally consisted of 34 pieces, for vocalists, mixed-voice choir, harmonium and a large orchestra.  It was first performed in Copenhagen on 15 March 1926.  The first night attracted international attention but Sibelius was not present. Reviews noted that "Shakespeare and Sibelius, these two geniuses, have finally found one another", and praised in particular the part played by the music and stage sets.  Only four days later Sibelius set off for an extended trip to work on new commissions in Rome.  He did not hear the music for the first time until the autumn of 1927 when the Finnish National Theatre in Helsinki staged the work.  For this performance, he composed an alternative Epilogue, bringing the number of items to 35.

The Overture has been described as "the single most onomatopoetic stretch of music ever composed".  Sibelius published the Overture as a separate piece, and arranged two suites from the music, comprising 19 pieces.  These suites condensed and combined items from the stage music, sometimes in ways that obscure the drama. It is in the form of these suites that the music has been most frequently heard in the concert hall and on recordings.  Various recordings do not stick to the formal suites but include other items.

The complete Incidental Music was not recorded for the first time until 1992, by the Lahti Symphony Orchestra, Lahti Opera Chorus, and soloists under Osmo Vänskä, as part of the complete recordings of all Sibelius's works.  Recordings of the suites include those by Sir Thomas Beecham, Sir Charles Groves, Horst Stein, Leif Segerstam and Michael Stern.

Structure of the Incidental Music
No. 1. Overture
Act 1
No. 2, Miranda Falls Asleep
No. 3, Ariel Flies In
No. 4, Chorus of the Winds
No. 5, Ariel Hurries Away
No. 6, Ariel's First Song with introduction and chorus
No. 7, Ariel's Second Song
Act 2
No. 8, Interlude
No. 9, The Oak Tree
No. 10, Ariel's Third Song
No. 11, Interlude
No. 12, Stephano's Song
No. 13, Caliban's Song
Act 3
No. 14, Interlude
No. 15 Humoreske
No. 16, Canon
No. 17, Devils' Dance
No. 18, Ariel as a Harpy
No. 19, Dance II [The Devils Dance Away]
No. 20, Intermezzo 
Act 4
No. 21, Ariel Flies In [= No. 3]
No. 22, Ariel's Fourth Song
No. 23, The Rainbow
No. 24, Iris's Recitation
No. 25, Juno's Song
No. 26, Dance Of The Naiads
No. 27, The Harvester
No. 28, Ariel Flies In [= No. 3]
No. 29, Ariel Flies Off [= No. 5]
No. 30, Ariel Flies In
No. 31, The Dogs
Act 5
No. 31bis, Overture
No. 32 Intrada
No. 33, Ariel's Fifth Song
No. 34, Cortège
No. 34bis, Epilogue.

Structure of the Suites
The references in brackets are to the origin of the music in the original score.

Suite No. 1 for Piano, Op. 109/2
 1. The Oak (No. 18, Ariel as a Harpy, followed by No. 9, The Oak Tree)
 2. Humoreske (No. 15)
 3. Caliban's Song (No. 13)
 4. The Harvesters (No. 19, Dance II The Devils Dance Away; No. 27, The Harvester)
 5. Canon (No. 16)
 6. Scene (No. 11, Interlude; No. 31, The Dogs)
 7a. Intrada (No. 32)
 7b. Berceuse (No. 2, Miranda Falls Asleep)
 8a. Interlude (No, 23, The Rainbow)
 8b. Ariel's Song (No. 7, Ariel's Second Song)
 9. Overture (No. 1)

Suite No. 2 for Piano, Op. 109/3
 1. Chorus of the Winds (No. 4)
 2. Intermezzo (No. 20)
 3. Dance of Nymphs (No. 26, Dance of the Naiads)
 4. Prospero (No. 8, Interlude)
 5. Song I (No. 22, Ariel's Fourth Song)
 6. Song II (No. 31 bis, Overture; No. 33, Ariel's Fifth Song)
 7. Miranda (No. 14, Interlude)
 8. The Naiads (No. 6, Ariel's First Song)
 9. Dance Episode (No. 17, Devils' Dance)

References

External links

 Jean Sibelius: The music
 The Flying Inkpot: Sibelius' Farewell
 www.classicalsource.com

Incidental music by Jean Sibelius
Suites by Jean Sibelius
Compositions for symphony orchestra
1926 compositions
Music based on works by William Shakespeare
Works based on The Tempest